Igrexa de Santiago is a church in A Coruña, Province of A Coruña, Galicia, Spain. Founded in the 12th century, it became a historic monument on 18 August 1972.

References

12th-century Roman Catholic church buildings in Spain
Roman Catholic churches in Galicia (Spain)
Buildings and structures in the Province of A Coruña
A Coruña
Bien de Interés Cultural landmarks in the Province of A Coruña